Christine Goodwin (4 June 1937  8 December 2014) was a British transgender rights activist who played a crucial role in forcing the UK government to introduce the Gender Recognition Act 2004. She was a former bus driver who underwent sex reassignment surgery in 1990, at Charing Cross Hospital, London, before eventually challenging the UK government in the European Court of Human Rights over her inability to draw a state pension at the same age as other women. In Goodwin & I v United Kingdom the ECHR ruled that the UK had breached her rights under the European Convention of Human Rights. In response the UK introduced the Gender Recognition Act 2004.

On 8 December 2014, Goodwin died because of a long-time illness. Goodwin was hailed as "a trailblazer for trans rights" and a "pioneer" by trans rights network Transgender Europe.

References 

Transgender women
Transgender rights activists
English LGBT people
2014 deaths
1937 births
British LGBT rights activists
21st-century LGBT people